Stefan Gossler (born 1955) is a German actor and voice actor from Siegen.

Voice roles

Anime
Case Closed (Gin)
Digimon Frontier (Gigasmon, Grumblemon)
Dr. Slump (Doctor Mashirito (first voice))
Dragon Ball Z & Dragonball Z Kai (Cell)
Texhnolyze (Keigo Ōnishi)
The Vision of Escaflowne (Dryden Fassa)

Dubbing roles
Glee (Principal Figgins (Iqbal Theba))
Madagascar (King Julien (Sacha Baron Cohen))
The Penguins of Madagascar (King Julien (Danny Jacobs)
The Medallion (Eddie Yang (Jackie Chan))
Ned's Declassified School Survival Guide (Mister Melvin Kwest (Dave "Gruber" Allen))
Rumble in the Bronx (Keung (Jackie Chan))
Rush Hour (Chief Inspector Lee (Jackie Chan))
Rush Hour 2 (Chief Inspector Lee (Jackie Chan))
Rush Hour 3 (Chief Inspector Lee (Jackie Chan))
The Santa Clause 3: The Escape Clause (Santa Claus/Scott Calvin (Tim Allen))
The Shaggy Dog (Dave Douglas (Tim Allen))
Thunderbolt (Chan Foh To (Jackie Chan))
Wild Hogs (Doug Madsen (Tim Allen))

External links
Biography on agency site
Stefan Gossler at the German Dubbing Card Index
Stefan Gossler on IMDb

1955 births
Living people
German male voice actors